Lea Road railway station was on the Preston and Wyre Joint Railway in the parish of Lea and Cottam in Preston, Lancashire, England.  It opened in 1842, and closed on 2 May 1938.

Lea Road was located adjacent to the site of the proposed Cottam railway station.

References

External links
Local web site with Photos of station

Disused railway stations in the City of Preston
Former Preston and Wyre Joint Railway stations
Railway stations in Great Britain opened in 1842
Railway stations in Great Britain closed in 1938
1842 establishments in England
1938 disestablishments in England